Parliamentary elections were held in Guam in March 1931.

Background
In March 1931 Governor Willis W. Bradley dissolved the First Guam Congress, stating that it was "not functioning either as a representative body or in a manner to take full advantage of its responsibilities." He issued a proclamation that created a bicameral Congress with a 27-member House of Representatives and a 15-member House of Council. Members of the House of Representatives were to serve for two years and members of the House of Council for four.

Aftermath
The Second Guam Congress met for the first time on 2 April 1931, with Bradley opening the meeting.

References

1931 in Guam
Legislative elections in Guam
Guam